Sharpe–Gentry Farm, also known as the John O. Sharpe Farm, is a historic farm and national historic district located near Propst Crossroads, Catawba County, North Carolina. The district encompasses 6 contributing buildings and 1 contributing site. The house was built about 1903, and is a 1 1/2-story, Queen Anne style frame farmhouse.  Also on the property are the contributing engine room (c. 1923), shed, granary, garage, and barn.

It was added to the National Register of Historic Places in 1990.

References

Farms on the National Register of Historic Places in North Carolina
Historic districts on the National Register of Historic Places in North Carolina
Queen Anne architecture in North Carolina
Houses completed in 1903
Houses in Catawba County, North Carolina
National Register of Historic Places in Catawba County, North Carolina